Manitowoc Rapids is a town in Manitowoc County, Wisconsin, United States. The population was 2,520 at the 2000 census. The unincorporated communities of Alverno, Branch, and Kellners Corners are located in the town.

Geography
According to the United States Census Bureau, the town has a total area of 27.6 square miles (71.5 km2), of which, 27.4 square miles (70.9 km2) of it is land and 0.2 square miles (0.6 km2) of it (0.91%) is water.

Demographics
As of the census of 2000, there were 2,520 people, 809 households, and 669 families residing in the town. The population density was 92.1 people per square mile (35.6/km2).  There were 822 housing units at an average density of 30.0 per square mile (11.6/km2). The racial makeup of the town was 98.97% White, 0.16% African American, 0.16% Native American, 0.12% Asian, 0.48% from other races, and 0.12% from two or more races. Hispanic or Latino of any race were 0.95% of the population.

There were 809 households, out of which 34.1% had children under the age of 18 living with them, 76.5% were married couples living together, 3.3% had a female householder with no husband present, and 17.3% were non-families. 14.1% of all households were made up of individuals, and 6.1% had someone living alone who was 65 years of age or older. The average household size was 2.78 and the average family size was 3.08.

In the town, the population was spread out, with 22.5% under the age of 18, 6.7% from 18 to 24, 22.9% from 25 to 44, 27.9% from 45 to 64, and 20.0% who were 65 years of age or older. The median age was 44 years. For every 100 females, there were 86.7 males. For every 100 females age 18 and over, there were 81.4 males.

The median income for a household in the town was $56,548, and the median income for a family was $61,575. Males had a median income of $37,083 versus $24,301 for females. The per capita income for the town was $21,323. About 1.4% of families and 11.1% of the population were below the poverty line, including 4.4% of those under age 18 and 34.1% of those age 65 or over.

Notable people
Isaac Craite, Wisconsin judge, businessman, and legislator
Charles H. Walker, Wisconsin judge, lawyer, and legislator

Recreation
Branch Recreation Park is located in Branch in Manitowoc Rapids. Along with many youth softball and baseball programs the park is home to the Branch Blaze amateur baseball team.

References

External links 
Town of Manitowoc Rapids

Towns in Manitowoc County, Wisconsin
Towns in Wisconsin